The  is a part of the extensive rapid transit system that consists of Tokyo Metro and the Toei Subway in Tokyo, Saitama, Chiba, the Greater Tokyo area of Japan. While the subway system itself is largely within the city center, the lines extend far out via extensive through services onto suburban railway lines.

Networks
There are two primary subway operators in Tokyo:

 Tokyo Metro – Formerly a statutory corporation called the Teito Rapid Transit Authority (TRTA), it was converted into a kabushiki gaisha (joint-stock company) in 2004.
 Toei Subway – run by the Tokyo Metropolitan Bureau of Transportation, an agency of the Tokyo Metropolitan Government.

The Tokyo Metro and Toei networks together carry a combined average of over eight million passengers daily. Despite being ranked second overall in worldwide subway usage (after the Shanghai Metro), subways make up a relatively small fraction of heavy rail rapid transit in Tokyo alone—only 286 out of 938 railway stations, as of 2020. The Tokyo subway at 8.7 million daily passengers only represents 22% of Tokyo's 40 million daily rail passengers (see Transport in Greater Tokyo). Other urban commuter rail systems include Keikyu Corporation (formerly the Keihin Electric Express Railway), Keio Corporation, Keisei Electric Railway, Odakyu Electric Railway, Seibu Railway, Tobu Railway and Tokyu Corporation.

In addition, but not formally designated as subways:

 The Tokyo Waterfront Area Rapid Transit (TWR) operates a single mostly-underground line with eight stations, and 200,200 daily passengers in 2010.
 The Saitama Rapid Railway Line, which is essentially an extension of the Tokyo Metro Namboku Line, operates a single mostly-underground line with eight stations.
 The Tōyō Rapid Railway Line, which is essentially an extension of the Tokyo Metro Tōzai Line, operates a single underground/elevated line with nine stations.
 The Yamanote Line and Chūō Line (Rapid) are not subway lines, but a surface commuter loop line (Yamanote Line) and a cross-city line that operate with metro-like frequencies. They are owned by JR East, act as key transportation arteries in central Tokyo, and are often marked on Tokyo subway maps.

The Yokohama Subway and the Minatomirai Line also operate in the Greater Tokyo Area, but they are not directly connected to the Tokyo subway network. However, direct through services from the Tokyo Metro Fukutoshin Line regularly run into Yokohama's Minatomirai Line via the Tōkyū Tōyoko Line.

History

 1915: Japan's first underground railway opened under Tokyo Station. It was only for the railway post office, not for passengers.
 1927:  opened Japan's first underground line of the subway Ginza Line on December 30, 1927, and publicized as "the first underground railway in the Orient." The distance of the line was only 2.2 km between Ueno and Asakusa.
 1938:  opened its subway system between Aoyama 6-chome (present-day Omotesando) and Toranomon.
 1939: Tokyo Rapid Transit Railway extended its line from Toranomon to Shimbashi, and started an reciprocal operation with Tokyo Underground Railway.
 1941: During World War II, the two subway companies merged under the name  by the local government.
 1954: The Marunouchi Line, the first subway line after World War II, opened between Ikebukuro and Ochanomizu.
 1960: Toei Subway Line 1, present-day Toei Asakusa Line, opened between Oshiage and Asakusa.
 1968: Toei Subway Line 6 (currently the Toei Mita Line) opened between Shimura Station (renamed Takashimadaira Station in 1969) and Sugamo Station.
 1991: The Tokyo Metro Namboku Line opens.
 1995: On March 20, the Tokyo subway sarin attack occurred on the Marunouchi, Hibiya, and Chiyoda Lines during the morning rush hour. Over 5,000 people were injured and 13 people were killed. All three lines ceased operation for the whole day.
 2000: The Namboku Line opened between Tameike-sanno Station and Meguro Station and the Toei Mita Line opened between Mita Station and Meguro Station, with both lines sharing infrastructure between Meguro Station and Shirokane-takanawa Station. Additionally, both lines started through service with the Tokyu Meguro Line.
 2004: Teito Rapid Transit Authority was privatized and renamed Tokyo Metro Co., Ltd.
 2008: The Fukutoshin Line opened.
 2013: The Fukutoshin Line started through service with the Tokyu Toyoko Line.
 2023 (planned): The Toei Mita Line, the Namboku Line, and the Fukutoshin Line will start through service with the Tōkyū Shin-Yokohama Line, the Sōtetsu Shin-Yokohama Line, the Sotetsu Main Line and the Izumino Line via the Tokyu Meguro Line (Toei Mita Line and Namboku Line) and the Tokyu Toyoko Line (Fukutoshin Line).

System administration
Both the Tokyo Metro and Toei Subway systems are closely integrated with a unified system of line colors, line codes, and station numbers. However, the separate administration of metro systems has some ramifications:

 For single rides across Metro and Toei systems, a special transfer ticket is required. It costs 70 yen less than the sum of the Metro fare and the Toei fare, calculated based on the shortest possible route between the origin and destination stations. The Passnet system simplified such ticketing problems, by allowing one stored-fare card to be used on most of the rail operators in the Greater Tokyo Area (with the noticeable exception of JR East which continued to use its own Suica system). The new Pasmo system was introduced in 2007 and completely replaced the Passnet in 2008, finally allowing for one unified stored fare system for most of the Tokyo transit system, including JR East. The fare charged by the stored fare system may be slightly less than for users of paper tickets, as fares are calculated in ¥1 increments on stored fare cards whereas paper tickets are calculated at ¥10 increments.
 The systems represent the metro network differently in station, train, and customer information diagrams. For example, the Toei map represents the Toei Ōedo Line as a circle in the centre, whereas the Tokyo Metro's map saves the central ring line for the Marunouchi Line and the JR Yamanote Line.  As well, each system's lines are generally rendered with thicker lines on their respective system maps.

Reciprocal operation
As is common with Japanese subway systems, many above-ground and underground lines in the Greater Tokyo Area operate through services with the Tokyo Metro and Toei lines. In a broader sense they are considered a part of the Tokyo subway network, allowing it to reach farther out into the suburbs.

Tokyo Metro

Toei Subway

Rolling stock

1995 sarin attack

In 1995, Aum Shinri Kyo, a doomsday cult, attacked the subway system with sarin nerve gas at Kasumigaseki Station and a few others, leading to 13 deaths and over 5,000 people injured.

See also
 Tokyo Metropolitan Subway Construction Company

References

Further reading

External links

Combined Metro and Toei map (PDF)

 
Rail transport in Tokyo
Underground rapid transit in Japan